Joseph Carolan (8 September 1937 – 26 September 2018) was an Irish professional footballer who played as a full-back in the Football League for Manchester United and Brighton & Hove Albion.

Born in Dublin, Carolan started his career with Home Farm at youth level before moving to Manchester United on 15 February 1956, where he featured in their FA Youth Cup winning team. On 22 November 1958, Carolan made his senior debut against Luton Town. He broke into the first team nine months after the Munich air disaster, which had claimed the lives of eight United players - including his fellow countryman Bill Whelan - and resulted in two other players being injured to such an extent that they never played again.

He played 71 times for United between 1958 and 1960 and won two caps for the Republic of Ireland making his debut on the 1 November 1959.

Carolan joined Brighton and Hove Albion in December 1960. He joined Tonbridge in 1962 before signing for Canterbury City in 1968.

He died in September 2018.

References

1937 births
2018 deaths
Republic of Ireland association footballers
Republic of Ireland international footballers
Association football fullbacks
Home Farm F.C. players
League of Ireland players
Manchester United F.C. players
Brighton & Hove Albion F.C. players
Tonbridge Angels F.C. players
English Football League players
Canterbury City F.C. players
Association footballers from Dublin (city)